Francis Herring M.D. (died 1628) was an English physician, known as a medical and religious writer.

Life
A native of Nottinghamshire, Herring was educated at Christ's College, Cambridge (B.A. 1585, M.A. 1589). On 3 July 1599, then a doctor of medicine of Cambridge of two years' standing, he was admitted a fellow of the College of Physicians of London. He was censor in 1609, 1618, 1620, 1623, 1624, 1626, and 1627. He was named an elect on 5 June 1623, and died in the beginning of 1628.

Works

He translated from the Latin of Johann Oberndoerffer, The Anatomyes of the True Physition and Counterfeit Mounte-banke: wherein both of them are graphically described, and set out in their Right and Orient Colours, London, 1602; adding, as appendix, A short Discourse, or Discouery of certaine Stratagems, whereby our London-Empericks haue bene obserued strongly to oppugne, and oft times to expugne their Poore Patients Purses. Herring's other writings were:

 In fœlicissimum … Jacobi primi, Angliæ … Regis, … ad Anglicanæ Reip. gubernacula Ingressum, Poema Gratulatorium, London, 1603.
 Certaine Rules, Directions or Advertisements for this time of Pestilentiall Contagion: with a Caveat to those that weare about their Neckes impoisoned Amulets as a Preservative from the Plague … reprinted … Whereunto is added certaine directions for the poorer sort of people, London, (1603, revised 1625). Another edition, entitled Preservatives against the Plague, was published in 1665.
 A modest Defence of the Caveat given to the wearers of impoisoned Amulets, as Preservatives from the Plague. … Likewise that unlearned … opinion, that the Plague is not infectious, … is … refuted by way of preface, London, 1604. Peter Turner had responded to the previous work with a pamphlet defending the medical properties, particularly against the plague, of amulets containing arsenical compounds. Here Herring replied on behalf of the College of Surgeons.
 Pietas Pontificia, seu, Conjurationis illius prodigiosæ, … in Jacobum … Regē … Novembris quinto, … 1605 … brevis adumbratio poetica, 1606. This was a Latin poem in 493 hexameters, on the Gunpowder Plot and popery. An English verse translation by A. P. was published with the title of Popish Pietie in 1610. 
 Pietas Pontificia … ab authore recognita … Accessit Venatio Catholica sive secunda Historiæ pars, &c. (In Jesuitas Epigramma, &c.), London, 1609.

Under the title of Mischeefes Mysterie both parts of Herring's poem on the Gunpowder plot, with A Psalme of Thankesgiving, and An Epigram against Jesuites, were translated into English by John Vicars London, 1617. Another edition, entitled The Quintessence of Cruelty, appeared in 1641.

Notes

Attribution

Year of birth missing
1628 deaths
17th-century English medical doctors
English writers
People from Nottinghamshire